Rhinebothriidea is an order of Cestoda (tapeworms). Members of this order are gut parasites of stingrays.

Named Species of Rhinebothrium 
Out of the nine species of potamotrygonids, only five Rhinebothrium have been named;

 R. copi-anullum from the Paratrygon aiereba in Peru
 R. paranaense from the Potamotrygon falkneri in Paraguay
 R. mistyae from the P. motoro in Argentina
 R. corbatai from the P. motoro in Argentina
 R.  paratrygoni  from the Potamotrygon falkneri in South America

More research is being done one the remaining four species of Rhinebothrium, but as of right now this is a lot of information as it is. From this we are able to use scientific and technological advancements to help the whole of our stingray population.

References
3. ↑Menoret, Adriana. “Descriptions of Two New Freshwater Neotropical Species of Rhinebothrium (Cestoda: Rhinebothriidea) from Potamotrygon Motoro (Chondrichthyes: Potamotrygonidae).” Folia Parasitologica.

Cestoda
Platyhelminthes orders